Thomas Raymond Ball (February 12, 1896 – June 16, 1943) was a U.S. Representative from Connecticut.

Early life
Born in New York City, Ball attended the public schools, Anglo-Saxon School, Paris, France, Heathcote School, Harrison, New York, and the Art Students League, New York City. He engaged as a designer in 1916.

World War I
During the First World War, he served in the Depot Battalion, Seventh New York Infantry (in 1917) and overseas with the Camouflage Section, Fortieth United States Engineers (from 1918 to 1919). After the war, he relocated to Old Lyme, Connecticut, and engaged in architectural pursuits.

Political career

Ball served as member of the board of education, and as served as selectman of Old Lyme, Connecticut, from 1926 to 1938. He also served in the State house of representatives from 1927 to 1937.

Ball was elected as a Republican to the Seventy-sixth Congress (January 3, 1939 – January 3, 1941). He was an unsuccessful candidate for reelection in 1940 to the Seventy-seventh Congress, after which he resumed his former pursuits at Old Lyme.

Death
Ball died in Old Lyme on June 16, 1943, and was interred in the Duck River Cemetery.

References

1896 births
1943 deaths
School board members in Connecticut
United States Army personnel of World War I
Republican Party members of the United States House of Representatives from Connecticut
Republican Party members of the Connecticut House of Representatives
20th-century American politicians
General Society of Colonial Wars